The 1963–64 Scottish Second Division was won by Morton who, along with second placed Clyde, were promoted to the First Division. Stirling Albion finished bottom.

Table

References

External links 
 Scottish Football Archive

Scottish Division Two seasons
2
Scot